Pham Hoai Nam (born February 21, 1967) is a Vietnamese general, and Vice Minister of Defense.

Pham Hoai Nam was born on February 21, 1967, at Hoai Hao, Hoai Nhon, Binh Dinh, Vietnam. He joined the Communist Party of Vietnam on January, 2011. He is a member of Central Committee of the Communist Party of Vietnam 12th, 13th; Congressman in National Assembly of Vietnam.

Career

Pham Hoai Nam was born in Hoai Hao, Hoai Nhon, Binh Dinh province.

In 1990, he graduated on Baku Naval Academy. Returning home, he worked for the navy.

In 2009, he was appointed Deputy Commander cum Chief of Staff of Naval Region 4.

In 2012, he was appointed Commander of Naval Region 4.

In 2014, he was appointed Deputy Commander cum Chief of Staff of the Navy.

In 2015, he became Commander of the Navy

In 2018, he was promoted to the rank of vice admiral by President Tran Dai Quang.

In 2020, he was appointed Deputy Minister of Defense cum Navy Commander.

In 2021, he was promoted to the rank of Colonel General.

References

1967 births
Living people
Vietnamese admirals
Vietnamese generals
Alternates of the 11th Central Committee of the Communist Party of Vietnam
Members of the 12th Central Committee of the Communist Party of Vietnam
Members of the 13th Central Committee of the Communist Party of Vietnam